Ivaylo Velinov (: born 2 August 1986 in Sofia) is a Bulgarian footballer. He currently plays as a defender for SC Brühl 06/45. Velinov is a right back.

Career
He start to play football in the little club Akademik Sofia . After that plays and in junior teams of Slavia Sofia. In 2006, he signed with Belasitsa. Velinov made his debut in Bulgarian top division in a match against PFC Chernomorets Burgas Sofia on 9 September 2006. On 14 April 2007 the defender scored his first goal in professional football in a match against Marek Dupnitsa. He scored goal in 90th minute.

Statistics

External links
 Ivaylo Velinov profile at football24.bg 

1988 births
Living people
Bulgarian footballers
First Professional Football League (Bulgaria) players
PFC Belasitsa Petrich players
Association football defenders